The 1937–38 Czechoslovak Extraliga season was the second season of the Czechoslovak Extraliga, the top level of ice hockey in Czechoslovakia. 14 teams participated in the league, and LTC Prag won the championship. The league was not played again until the 1945–46 season, due to World War II.

Regular season

Group A

Group B

Final
LTC Prag 5 AC Sparta Prag 1

External links
History of Czechoslovak ice hockey

Czechoslovak Extraliga seasons
Czech
1937 in Czechoslovak sport
1938 in Czechoslovak sport